Luis Cosme (born 21 December 2000), is a Puerto Rican international footballer who plays as a left back for Bayamón.

References

External links

2000 births
Living people
Puerto Rican footballers
Puerto Rico international footballers
Association football defenders